Donovan House may refer to:

Donovan-Hussey Farms Historic District, Houlton, Maine, including the Donovan House/Farm, listed on the National Register of Historic Places (NRHP)
Donovan-Mayer House, Helena, Montana, NRHP-listed in Lewis and Clark County
J. J. Donovan House, also known as Donovan House, in Bellingham, Washington, NRHP-listed
Donovan House (Washington, D.C.), a hotel